{{Infobox television
| picture_format       = 576i (PAL) 16:9
| audio_format         = Stereo
| editor               = Philip Kloss
| runtime              = 80 mins.
| company              = BBC Films
| language             = English
| country              = United Kingdom
| network              = BBC One
| first_aired          = 
| starring             = Neil Morrissey Rachel Weisz Des Lynam Arabella Weir  John Gordon Sinclair
| genre                = Football Comedy Drama
| screenplay           = Arthur Smith
| director             = Simon Curtis
| executive_producer   = Jane Tranter
| producer             = Joy Spink
| cinematography       = Graham Frake
| music                = Jim Parker
| related              = Match of the Day}}My Summer with Des is a 1998 comedy drama television film, written by Arthur Smith, and directed by Simon Curtis. Broadcast to coincide with the beginning of World Cup 1998, the story is set during the European football championships in 1996, where football fan Martin finds his life is going from bad to worse after losing his job and splitting up with his girlfriend. It starred Neil Morrissey and Des Lynam, with Rachel Weisz playing the role of his love interest who seems to have the ability to travel through time and know the outcome of the tournament's matches before they happen. At one point Neil Morrissey's character asks her to take him straight to the semi-final between England and Germany, which they then arrive at in the next scene.

The film was broadcast on BBC One on 25 May 1998, and released on VHS on 26 May 1998.

A DVD was scheduled for a 4 August 2008 release, however this was postponed.

 Cast 
 Neil Morrissey as Martin
 Rachel Weisz as Rosie
 Des Lynam as himself
 John Gordon Sinclair as Cameron
 Arabella Weir as Barbara
 Graeme Garden as Angus
 Tilly Blackwood as Anna

 Cameos by football stars 
 David Seaman
 Peter Shilton

 See also 
 An Evening with Gary Lineker''

External links

References 

1998 television films
1998 films
British comedy-drama television films
British sports comedy-drama films
1990s sports comedy-drama films
British association football films
Films directed by Simon Curtis
Films set in 1996
UEFA Euro 1996
1990s English-language films
1990s British films